The .20 Tactical is a wildcat centerfire rifle cartridge, based on the .223 Remington case, necked down to fire a  caliber bullet. The .20 Tactical was designed by Todd Kindler and predates the .204 Ruger factory round. The case has approximately  less powder capacity than the popular .204 Ruger.  Handloaders can get velocities with  projectiles that almost match the .204 Ruger.  Furthermore, the .20 Tactical is also able to achieve these velocities with less powder than the .204 Ruger by more efficiently using high energy propellants such as Alliant Reloader 7 and Winchester 748.  Based on the .223 Remington, a wide selection of brass is available, and can also be formed from .223 casings by use of a forming die.

See also
.204 Ruger
.20 VarTarg
.221 Fireball
.20 PPC
.20 BR
5 mm caliber
List of rifle cartridges

External links
 Case Dimensions

References

 6mmBR
 Woodchuck Den

Pistol and rifle cartridges
Wildcat cartridges